Argo Point is a prominent rock headland rising steeply to  on the east side of the Jason Peninsula,  northeast of Veier Head on the east coast of Graham Land. Probably first seen by Carl Anton Larsen in 1893, it was surveyed by the Falkland Islands Dependencies Survey in 1953 and named by the UK Antarctic Place-Names Committee in 1956. The name derives from association with the Jason Peninsula; Jason sailed in the Argo to search for the golden fleece.

References 

Headlands of Graham Land
Oscar II Coast